Ceratanisini is a tribe of darkling beetles in the subfamily Pimeliinae of the family Tenebrionidae. There are at least two genera in Ceratanisini.

Genera
These genera belong to the tribe Ceratanisini
 Ceratanisus Gemminger, 1870  (the Palearctic)
 Tenebriocephalon Pic, 1925  (Indomalaya)

References

Further reading

 
 

Tenebrionoidea